Wilford Hall Ambulatory Surgical Center, formerly known as Wilford Hall Medical Center, is a U.S. Air Force medical treatment facility located on the grounds of San Antonio's Lackland Air Force Base. Operated by the 59th Medical Wing, Wilford Hall is the Defense Department's largest outpatient ambulatory surgical center, providing the full spectrum of primary care, specialty care, and outpatient surgery. The medical facility is named after former Air Force physician, Maj. Gen. Wilford F. Hall, a visionary pioneer whose contributions were instrumental in the development of aeromedical evacuation.

In US Air Force lineage terms, the Wilford Hall Medical Center was consolidated with the 59th Tactical Fighter Wing on 1 July 1993 and became the 59th Medical Wing.

On Sept. 15, 2011, Wilford Hall Medical Center was renamed Wilford Hall Ambulatory Surgical Center as part of the 2005 Base Realignment and Closure Commission actions.

References

External links

Official 59th Medical Wing website

Hospitals in Texas
Joint Base San Antonio
Military hospitals in the United States
Medical installations of the United States Air Force
Centers of the United States Air Force
Medical units and formations of the United States Air Force
Healthcare in San Antonio
Military facilities in Texas